Norbert De Cuyper (born 14 April 1943 in Uitkerke) is a Belgian, Flemish politician. He was the mayor of Torhout from 1991 to 2016.

Political career 
Norbert De Cuyper was asked by then Mayor of Torhout Roger Windels to run for Schepen in the election of 1982 for CD&V. Norbert won the seat and became schepen of festivities, culture, education and middle class on 3 January 1983, he held this position until 1991 therefore being the longest serving schepen of Torhout, a record that has not been broken since. During his first legislature as schepen of Torhout, he was recorded in the Guinness Book of World Records for the most soup made in one go. After breaking the record together with the town on the Markt of Torhout, he and the participants sold the soup to all onlookers who had gathered at the site.

When the opportunity came for Norbert to become Mayor of Torhout in 1991, he didn't want to run in first place, it were his colleagues who put him forward for candidate. But after a convincing conversation with his father, he agreed to run for the office and he won the election. He became Mayor of Torhout on 31 May 1991 and retired from office 25 years later on 1 June 2016. He was succeeded by Flemish minister of education Hilde Crevits but she will first be replaced by acting-mayor Kristof Audenaert until her position as minister will have ended.

Personal life 
He married Monique De Zaeyer on 1 April 1967 and has 2 children, a girl Greet and a boy Geert. After his marriage he ran a gas station together with his wife in Torhout. Now he still has a printing office which he runs with his family (whom also holds a number of political offices).

He also still plays theatre in Torhout, his lifelong passion, and loves to use a camera to create in his own words: Paintings with light.

See also 
 List of mayors of Torhout

References

1943 births
Living people
Mayors of Torhout